Genius Loves Company is the final studio album by rhythm and blues and soul musician Ray Charles, posthumously released August 31, 2004, on Concord Records. Recording sessions for the album took place between June 2003 and March 2004.  The album consists of rhythm and blues, soul, country, blues, jazz and pop standards performed by Charles and several guest musicians, such as Natalie Cole, Elton John, James Taylor, Norah Jones, B.B. King, Gladys Knight, Diana Krall, Van Morrison, Willie Nelson and Bonnie Raitt. Genius Loves Company was the last album recorded and completed by Charles before his death in June 2004.

The album was produced by Concord A&R man, John Burk, who approached Charles with the concept of a duets album for a collaboration of Concord Records and Hear Music, the record label owned by the coffee chain Starbucks. It served as the first original non-compilation release by Hear Music, as well as one of Ray Charles' most commercially successful albums. On February 2, 2005, Genius Loves Company was certified triple-platinum in sales by the Recording Industry Association of America following sales of over three million copies in the United States. It also became Charles' second to reach number one on the Billboard 200, after Modern Sounds in Country and Western Music (1962). On February 13, 2005, the album was awarded eight Grammy Awards including Album of the Year and Record of the Year.

Reception

Commercial performance
Genius Loves Company proved to be a comeback success for Ray Charles, in terms of sales and critical response, quickly becoming his first top-10 album in forty years and the best-selling record of his career. The release of Genius Loves Company served as Charles' two-hundred fiftieth of his recording career, as well as his last recorded effort before his death on June 10, 2004.

Within its first week of release, the album sold over 200,000 copies in the United States alone,<ref>[http://findarticles.com/p/articles/mi_m0EIN/is_/ai_n6244399?tag=untagged Ray Charles Scores First Platinum Recording of Career; ``Genius Loves Company Is Music Legend's] . Business Wire. Retrieved on 2008-12-26.</ref> while it debuted at #2 on the Billboard 200 chart, eventually ascending to #1 on March 5, 2005, becoming Charles' first #1 album since Modern Sounds In Country And Western Music in 1962. Genius Loves Company also received a significant amount of airplay on jazz, blues, R&B, urban contemporary and country radio stations, as well as critical praise from well-known publications and music outlets. By the first month of its release, the album had shipped over two million copies in the United States and shipped more than three million worldwide, receiving gold, silver and platinum certifications across North America, Europe and several other regions. The massive commercial success of the album (over 5.5 million copies were sold worldwide up to 2007) was attributed in part to it being distributed and promoted via Starbucks coffeehouses, as well as the distribution and marketing relationship between Concord Records and the Starbucks Hear Music label. The Starbucks Coffee Company proved to be singularly responsible for nearly thirty-percent of the total domestic sales of the album. Following several certifications of gold, platinum and multi-platinum in the United States during the fall of 2004, Genius Loves Company earned a triple-platinum sales certification by the Recording Industry Association of America (RIAA) on February 2, 2005.

For the week ending September 18, 2004, Genius Loves Company sold 202,000 copies, ranking second on the Billboard 200. This was Charles' highest charting album in over 40 years and represented an opening week record for a duets album (since Nielsen SoundScan began tracking such statistics in 1991). Frank Sinatra's 1993 Duets sold 339,000 during the Christmas week, eight weeks after its 173,500-unit opening. The initial shipment of 733,000 units was an all-time record for the 31-year history of Concord Records and the sales represented a Soundscan record for the company. In addition, the album placed at number five on the Top R&B/Hip-Hop Albums for Charles' highest placement since A Portrait of Ray peaked at fifth in 1968.  These albums sales occurred despite digital singles sales that saw 12 of the 13 tracks on the album make the Hot Digital Tracks Top 50 chart.  The previous record for most tracks from the same album was 9 by Neil Young & Crazy Horse with their 2003 Greendale album. "Here We Go Again" was the download sales leader among the album's tracks, but the 12 tracks totaled 52,000 digital downloads.

Grammy Awards
In December 2004, announcements were made that the album had earned ten Grammy Award nominations. At the 47th Grammy Awards on February 13, 2005, Genius Loves Company'' led the annual ceremony with a total of nine awards, including Album of the Year, while its hit single "Here We Go Again" won a Grammy Award for Record of the Year. Awards won are as listed below:

Grammy Award for Album of the Year: John Burk, Phil Ramone, Herbert Waltl, Don Mizell (producers), Terry Howard (producer & engineer/mixer), Robert Fernandez, John Harris, Pete Karam, Joel Moss, Seth Presant, Al Schmitt, Ed Thacker (engineers/mixers), Robert Hadley, Doug Sax (mastering engineers)
Grammy Award for Best Pop Vocal Album: Ray Charles and various artists
Grammy Award for Best Engineered Album, Non-Classical: Robert Fernandez, John Harris, Terry Howard, Pete Karam, Joel Moss, Seth Presant, Al Schmitt & Ed Thacker (engineers)
Grammy Award for Best Surround Sound Album: John Burk (Producer), Al Schmitt (surround mix engineer), Robert Hadley & Doug Sax (surround mastering)
Grammy Award for Record of the Year: John Burk (producer), Terry Howard, Al Schmitt (engineers/mixers), Ray Charles & Norah Jones for "Here We Go Again"
Grammy Award for Best Pop Collaboration with Vocals: Ray Charles and Norah Jones for "Here We Go Again"
Grammy Award for Best Pop Collaboration with Vocals: Ray Charles and Elton John for "Sorry Seems To Be The Hardest Word" (nominated)
Grammy Award for Best Gospel Performance: Ray Charles & Gladys Knight for "Heaven Help Us All"
Grammy Award for Best Instrumental Arrangement Accompanying Vocalist(s): Victor Vanacore (arranger) for "Over the Rainbow" performed by Ray Charles & Johnny Mathis
The Album of the Year award was presented to coproducer John Burk, who accepted on behalf of himself and coproducer Phil Ramone, who was unable to make the trip to Los Angeles for the Grammy ceremony. The cover featured an iconic image by photographer Norman Seeff.

Track listing
In UK, this album was also published as LP record, where track 1 to 7 were on side A and the rest of tracks were on side B.

Chart history

Weekly charts

Year-end charts

Singles

Certifications

Personnel

John Acevedo - Viola
John Acosta - Cello
Sai Ly Acosta - Violin
Tawatha Agee - Vocals, Singer
Abbey Anna - Design, Design Consultant
Miguel Atwood - Ferguson Viola
Briana Bandy - Viola
Rick Baptist - Trumpet
Michael Bearden - Keyboards
Leanne Becknell-  Oboe
Brian Benning - Violin
Brian Bennison - Copyist
Robert Berg - Viola
Wayne Bergeron - Trumpet
David Blumberg - Arranger, String Arrangements
Charles Boito - Clarinet
Reverend Dave Boruff - Saxophone
Ray Brinker - Drums
Leslie Brown - Violin
John Burk - Producer, Liner Notes, Executive Producer
James Chip Burney - Choir, Chorus
Rosemary Butler - Choir, Chorus
Kristy Cameron - Design
Ray Charles - Piano, Keyboards, Vocals, Author
Daphne Chen - Violin
Elenore Choate - Harp
Tim Christensen - Double Bass
Ronald Clark - Violin
Janey Clewer - Choir, Chorus
Reginald Clews - Violin
Natalie Cole - Author, Guest Appearance
Mark Converse - Percussion
Larry Corbett - Cello
Franklyn d'Antonio - Violin
Charlie Davis - Trumpet
Jill Dell'Abate - Production Coordination
Greg Dennon - Assistant Engineer
Joel Derouin - Violin
Ken Desantis - Assistant Engineer
Steve Deutsch - Digital Editing
George Doering - Guitar
Assa Dori - Concert Master
Kevin Dorsey - Choir, Chorus
Assa Drori - Concert Master
DeAnte Duckett - Choir, Chorus
Chris Dunn - A&R
Clydene Jackson Edwards - Choir, Chorus
Michael Eleopoulos - Assistant Engineer
Alan Ellsworth - Violin
Alicia Engley - Violin
Charles Everett - Violin
Dennis Farias - Trumpet
Charles Fearing - Guitar
Andrew Felluss - Assistant Engineer
Robert Fernandez - Engineer
Brandon Fields - Baritone Saxophone
Kirstin Fife - Violin
Stefanie Fife - Cello
Mark Fleming - Engineer
  
Ronald Folsom - Violin
Samuel Formicola - Viola
Bruce Fowler - Trombone
Tom Fowler - Bass
Walt Fowler - Trumpet
James Gadson - Drums
Armen Garabedian - Violin
Berj Garabedian - Violin
Steve Genewick - Assistant Engineer
Jim Gilstrap - Choir, Chorus
Suzanna Giordono - Viola
Gary Grant - Trumpet
Nick Grant - Violin
Keith Gretlein - Assistant Engineer
Ken Gruberman - Copyist
Amy Wickman Guerra - Violin
Robert Hadley - Mastering
Larry Hall - Trumpet
Trevor Handy - Cello
John Harris - Engineer
David Hayes - Bass
Xiao Niu He - Violin
Trey Henry - Bass, Double Bass
Scott Higgins - Timpani
Gerry Hilera - Violin
Mary Hogan - A&R
Matt Holland - Trumpet
Terry Howard - Producer, Engineer
Greg Huckins - Flute
Alexander Isles - Trombone
Danny Jacob - Guitar
John Jennings - Photography
Elton John - Author, Guest Appearance
Bashiri Johnson - Percussion
Norah Jones - Piano, Author, Guest Appearance
Tony Kadleck - Trumpet
Hardi Kamsani - Assistant Engineer
Pete Karam - Engineer
Suzie Katayama - Cello
Leslie Brown Katz - Violin
Bill Kaylor - Assistant Engineer
Jim Keltner - Drums
Jaroslav Kettner - Violin
Jeff Kievit - Trumpet
David Kilbride - Violin
B.B. King - Guitar, Author, Guest Appearance
Gladys Knight - Author, Guest Appearance
Raymond Kobler - Violin
Diana Krall - Author, Guest Appearance
Irvin "Magic" Kramer - Rhythm Guitar
Johana Krejci - Violin
John Krovoza - Cello
Armen Ksadjikian - Cello
Steve Kujala - Flute
Lisa Laarman - Creative Director
Abraham Laboriel - Bass
Michael Landau - Guitar
Timothy Landauer - Cello
Songa Lee - Violin
 
Tricia Lee - Violin
David R. Legry - Liner Notes
Martha Lippi - Cello
Irene Madison - Choir, Chorus
Paul Manaster - Violin
Shawn Mann - Viola
George Marinelli - Guitar, Photography
Don Markese - Clarinet
Edith Markman - Violin
Michael Markman - Violin
Andrew Martin - Trombone
Fred Martin & the Levite Camp - Choir, Chorus
Rob Mathes - Conductor
Johnny Mathis - Author, Guest Appearance
Robert Matsuda - Violin
Bob McChesney - Trombone
Clarence McDonald - Piano, Arranger
Michael McDonald - Keyboards, Author, Guest Appearance
Joe Meyer - French Horn
Alethea Mills - Choir, Chorus
Jeff Mironov - Guitar
John Mitchell - Bassoon
Don Mizell - Producer
Dennis Molchan - Violin
Suzette Moriarty - French Horn
Charlie Morillas - Trombone
Horia Moroaica - Violin
Chavonne Morris - Choir, Chorus
Seven Morris - Choir, Chorus
Van Morrison - Author, Guest Appearance
Joel Moss - Engineer
Jennifer Munday - Violin
Vitaliano Napolitano - Photography
Willie Nelson - Guitar, Author, Guest Appearance
Maria Newman - Viola
Aminah Ofumbi - Choir, Chorus
Igor Pandurski - Violin
Alan Pasqua - Piano
Todor Pelev - Violin
Shawn Pelton - Drums
Edward Persi - Viola
Robert Peterson - Concert Master
Casey Phariss - Assistant Engineer
Darryl Phinnessee - Choir, Chorus
Andrew Picken - Viola
Charles Pillow - Tenor Saxophone
Vladimir Polimatidi - Violin
Seth Presant - Digital Editing
Billy Preston - Hammond Organ
Bonnie Raitt - Slide Guitar, Author, Guest Appearance
Phil Ramone - Producer
Shanti Randall - Viola
Michele Richards - Violin
Steve Richards - Cello
David Riddles - Bassoon
Carolyn Riley - Viola
Kathleen Robertson - Violin
   
John "4 Daddman" Robinson - Drums
Julie Rogers - Violin
Anatoly Rosinsky - Violin
Nancy Roth - Violin
Robert Sanders - Trombone
Tom Saviano - Saxophone
Doug Sax - Mastering
Kenny Scharf - Trumpet
Al Schmitt - Engineer, Mixing, String Engineer
Norman Seeff - Photography
Richard Shaw - Double Bass
Bob Shepard - Saxophone
Dennis Shirley - Photography
Jaime Sickora - Assistant Engineer
Joel Singer - Assistant Engineer
Jamie Siskkora - Assistant Engineer
Patricia Skye - French Horn
Bill Airey Smith - Assistant
Wally Snow - Percussion
Kurt Snyder - French Horn
Joe Soldo - Contractor
Jay Spears - Assistant Engineer
Edmund Stein-  Violin
Rudolph Stein - Cello
David Stenske - Violin, Viola
Dave Stone - Double Bass
Joseph Stone - Horn (English), Oboe
James Taylor - Author, Guest Appearance
Ed Thacker - Engineer
Vaneese Thomas - Vocals, Singer
Michael Thompson - Guitar
Fonzi Thornton - Vocals, Singer
Darrell Thorp - Assistant Engineer
Raymond Tischer - Viola
Richard Todd - French Horn
Kevan Torfeh - Cello
Francisco Torres - trombone
Mike Vaccaro - Contractor
David Vanacore - Score Assistance
Victor Vanacore - Arranger, Score Assistance
Karl Vincent - Double Bass
Irina Voloshina - Violin
Randy Waldman - Piano, Arranger, Keyboards, Rhythm Arrangements
David F. Walther - Viola
Herbert Waltl - Producer
Jennifer Walton - Violin
Zheng Wang - Violin
Clarissa Watkins - Choir, Chorus
Dynell Weber - Violin
John West - Choir, Chorus
Ken Wild - Double Bass
Martin Winning - Tenor Saxophone
North Wood - Violin
Terry Woods - Choir, Chorus
Margaret Wooten - Violin
Alwyn Wright - Violin
Phil Yao - French Horn
Ken Yerke - Violin
Yang-Qin Zhao - Cello

Notes

References

External links
Song by song analysis by Ray Charles - CD notes at Discogs.com
Genius Loves Company : Ray Charles : Concord Music Group

2004 albums
Ray Charles albums
Hear Music albums
Albums produced by Phil Ramone
Vocal duet albums
Albums published posthumously
Grammy Award for Album of the Year
Grammy Award for Best Pop Vocal Album
Grammy Award for Best Immersive Audio Album
Grammy Award for Best Engineered Album, Non-Classical